Dr. Ram Prakash is an Indian politician and a leader of Indian National Congress party. He is a former Member of the Parliament of India representing Haryana in the Rajya Sabha, the upper house of the Indian Parliament from 2007 to 2014 and currently he is also the chancellor of Gurukul Kangri University.

Early life
Dr Ram Prakash son of SH. Prabhu Dyal, was born on 5 October 1939, in village Tangore, Kurukshetra district of Haryana (formerly Punjab), India, of OBC (Other Backward Castes), Vishwakarma background. Through sheer dint of hard work, he passed his MSc and PhD degrees in Chemistry from the Punjab University, Chandigarh, and thereafter taught at this institution for long years. Later, he joined the new Kurukshetra University as the Pro-Vice Chancellor for a while.

Politics
He entered politics in 1990-1991 and in 1999 won the local elections on an Indian National Congress party ticket.
Being close to the Haryana Chief Minister, Bhupinder Singh Hooda, he eventually rose to be Working President of the INC party in Haryana and, in due course, was elevated to the Rajya Sabha in 2007.

Personal life
Dr Prakash was married in 1966, to SM. Vijay Kumari, and has two sons by his marriage. He lives mostly in Kurukshetra, Haryana, and also at New Delhi.

Positions held

Social Views
Dr Ram Prakash is a strong supporter of the Arya Samaj movement in Hinduism. He is also a prominent Vedic scholar and speaker with many books to his credit.

References

Indian National Congress politicians
1939 births
Living people
People from Kurukshetra district
Rajya Sabha members from Haryana
Charles University alumni